The Murfreesboro Cities Service Station is a historic automotive service station on Arkansas Highway 26, facing the northeast side of the town square in Murfreesboro, Arkansas.  It is a simple single-story brick building with a cross-gable roof and modest English Revival styling.  It was built in 1939 by A. P. Terrell, a local builder, using bricks from a building that had previously stood on the site.  It was operated as a Cities Service (later Citgo) gas station into the 1980s, and was purchased by the Murfreesboro Community Foundation in 1989.  The building plan for this structure is similar to that of other surviving Cities Service stations, including a station in Rison and another in Clinton.

The station was listed on the National Register of Historic Places in 2003.

See also
 Jones General Store and Esso Station: Also in Pike County, Arkansas
 National Register of Historic Places listings in Pike County, Arkansas

References

Gas stations on the National Register of Historic Places in Arkansas
Tudor Revival architecture in Arkansas
Commercial buildings completed in 1939
National Register of Historic Places in Pike County, Arkansas
Citgo
1939 establishments in Arkansas
Transportation in Pike County, Arkansas